The Z Was Zapped is a picture book by the American author Chris Van Allsburg originally published in 1987 by Houghton Mifflin. The book tells the story "in 26 acts", each showing how each letter in the alphabet caught some bad luck. The artwork has a stark look by using black and white pencil drawings. Each destruction of the letters take place on a proscenium theater stage.

Examples:  
 The A was in an avalanche.
 The B was badly bitten.
 The C was cut to ribbons.
 The Z was zapped.

References

1987 children's books
American picture books
Alphabet books
Picture books by Chris Van Allsburg
Houghton Mifflin books